Dionys Burger (10 July 1892, Amsterdam - 19 April 1987) was a Dutch secondary school physics teacher and author of the novel Sphereland.

References

1892 births
1987 deaths
Dutch mathematicians
Dutch science fiction writers
Utrecht University alumni
Writers from Amsterdam